Shafali Verma (born 28 January 2004) is an Indian cricketer who plays for the India women's national cricket team. In 2019, at the age of 15, she became the youngest cricketer to play in a Women's Twenty20 International match for India. In June 2021, she became the youngest player, male or female, to represent India in all three formats of international cricket. On 8 October 2022 she became the youngest cricketer to complete 1000 runs in T20 Internationals. Under her captaincy, India won the 2023 ICC Under-19 Women's T20 World Cup.

Early life
During her childhood, Verma initially played cricket disguised as a boy due to a lack of girls' cricket academies in Rohtak.

Career
Before international cricket, she played for Velocity in the Women's T20 Challenge in which she scored 34 runs in 31 balls. In September 2019, she was named in India's Women's Twenty20 International (WT20I) squad for their series against South Africa. She made her WT20I debut for India at the age of fifteen, against South Africa, on 24 September 2019. She was the youngest player to play for India in a T20I match, and in November 2019 against the West Indies, became the youngest half-centurion for India in international cricket. Against the West Indies, she scored 158 runs in five matches, and was named the player of the series.

In January 2020, she was named in India's squad for the 2020 ICC Women's T20 World Cup in Australia, and was awarded with a central contract by the Board of Control for Cricket in India (BCCI). Ahead of the 2020 ICC Women's T20 World Cup, she was ranked as the number one batter in women's T20I cricket.

In May 2021, she was named in India's Test and Women's One Day International (WODI) squads for their series against the England women's cricket team. Verma made her Test debut on 16 June 2021, for India against England, scoring 96 runs in her first Test innings. The Test match was drawn, and Verma was named the player of the match after scoring 159 runs in her two innings. Verma made her WODI debut for India, against England, on 27 June 2021. She was signed by Birmingham Phoenix for the first season of The Hundred.

She played for Sydney Sixers in the 2021 WBBL, where she scored her maiden fifty against Hobart Hurricanes. In January 2022, she was named in India's team for the 2022 Women's Cricket World Cup in New Zealand. In July 2022, she was named in India's team for the cricket tournament at the 2022 Commonwealth Games in Birmingham, England.

India opener Shafali Verma was sold to Delhi Capitals for Rs 2 crore at the Women’s Premier League Auction in Mumbai on Monday. In her first match against Royal Challengers Bangalore Challengers Bangalore,she scored her maiden fifty. She came to bat as an opener and scored 84 runs in just 45 balls.

References

External links

 

2004 births
Living people
Indian women cricketers
India women Test cricketers
India women One Day International cricketers
India women Twenty20 International cricketers
People from Rohtak
Cricketers from Haryana
Haryana women cricketers
IPL Velocity cricketers
Delhi Capitals (WPL) cricketers
Birmingham Phoenix cricketers
Sydney Sixers (WBBL) cricketers
Cricketers at the 2022 Commonwealth Games
Commonwealth Games silver medallists for India
Commonwealth Games medallists in cricket
Medallists at the 2022 Commonwealth Games